Enrique Dibos (25 September 1932 – 28 March 2007) was a Peruvian sports shooter. He competed at the 1960 Summer Olympics and the 1964 Summer Olympics.

References

1932 births
2007 deaths
Peruvian male sport shooters
Olympic shooters of Peru
Shooters at the 1960 Summer Olympics
Shooters at the 1964 Summer Olympics
People from Talara